Keidy Zoraida Moreno Marín (born in Maracay, Aragua, Venezuela) is a Venezuelan fashion model and photographer.

Modeling
Moreno started her career in the Miss Venezuela 2001 pageant representing Aragua state. In 2002, she represented Venezuela in the World Super Model contest in Beirut, Lebanon, where she won the title. Subsequently, Keidy signed with model agencies around the world.

Keidy had a successful career as an international model, working in the big capitals of fashion.  She has worked with recognized brands such as Roberto Caballi, Iceberg, Garnier, Cartier, Wella, Special K, Oil of Olay, Pantene, L'Oréal, Clairol, Koleston, Nivea, Swarovski, Johnnie Walker, lee jeans.

Lexus, and many more.

She was formerly represented by Ford Models in New York, Nevs Models in London, Crystal Models in Paris, Unity Models in Munich, Model Team in Hamburg, Fashion Model Management in Milan, New Model in Brussels, Time Models in Zurich, Sweden Models in Malmo, Elite Model Management in Miami, Ford Models in Chicago, LA Models and Innovative artist in Los Angeles.  Model Management in Hamburg, Unity Models in Munich,  Next Models in Canada, and Boss Model Management in Cape Town.

In 2003, 2005, and 2007, Moreno appeared on the cover and hosted the Amazonian project organization (NGOs), nonprofit organization dedicated to the creation, development and implementation of targeted programs for the protection and conservation of the environment.

Keidy is currently married to actor Daniel di Tomasso and she works as a Fashion photographer and is the Art Director at NFF (Nuts for Fashion) lifestyle and Fashion Magazine in Los Angeles, California.

References

External links
 https://www.keimoreno.com/
http://www.bellezavenezolana.net/MissVenezuela/MV01.htm
Keidy Moreno information in Fashion Model Directory
Keidy Moreno portfolio and contact Caracas, Venezuela
 https://www.keimoreno.com

1983 births
Living people
People from Aragua
Venezuelan female models
Venezuelan photographers